Irana Esperantisto (Iranian Esperantist) is an independent quarterly culture magazine, which is published in Esperanto and in Persian in Tehran and distributed internationally. A first series was published from 2002 to 2008, and a second series continously is edited from spring 2012 onwards. Its Persian title is Payame Sabz-andishan (literally: Message of the Green-Thinkers or the Green-Adepts). About half of the content of each edition is in Esperanto and the other half in Persian. From autumn 2020 onwards it features also articles in Arabic and Kurdish.

This magazine is an important forum for liberal and progressive thinking. In 2003, long articles about Shirin Ebadi, Alfred Nobel and Berta von Suttner were published in this magazine. Newsweek published some articles which were first published in Irana Esperantisto.

See also
List of Esperanto magazines

References

External links
 Online editions of Payame Sabz-andishan

Cultural magazines
Esperanto in Iran
Magazines established in 2002
Magazines published in Tehran
Persian-language magazines
Quarterly magazines
Esperanto magazines